Plishkino is a rural locality (a village) in Borovetskoye Rural Settlement, Sokolsky District, Vologda Oblast, Russia. The population was two as of 2002.

Geography 
Plishkino is located 16 km northwest of Sokol (the district's administrative centre) by road. Pochinok is the nearest rural locality.

References 

Rural localities in Sokolsky District, Vologda Oblast